Parmouti 7 - Coptic Calendar - Parmouti 9 

The eighth day of the Coptic month of Parmouti, the eighth month of the Coptic year. In common years, this day corresponds to April 3, of the Julian Calendar, and April 16, of the Gregorian Calendar. This day falls in the Coptic Season of Shemu, the season of the Harvest.

Commemorations

Martyrs 

 The martyrdom of the Saintly Virgins Agape, Eirene, and Shinoa 
 The martyrdom of the 150 Believers by the hand of the King of Persia

References 

Days of the Coptic calendar